Essex West and Hertfordshire East was a constituency of the European Parliament located in the United Kingdom, electing one Member of the European Parliament by the first-past-the-post electoral system. Created in 1994 from parts of Hertfordshire and Essex South West, it was abolished in 1999 on the adoption of proportional representation for European elections in the United Kingdom. It was succeeded by the East of England region.

Boundaries

It consisted of the parliamentary constituencies of Brentwood and Ongar, Broxbourne, Chelmsford, Epping Forest, Harlow, Hertford and Stortford and Stevenage. Broxbourne, Hertford and Stortford and Stevenage had previously been part of Hertfordshire constituency, while Brentwood and Ongar, Chelmsford, Epping Forest and Harlow had been part of Essex South West.

The entire area became part of the East of England constituency in 1999.

MEPs

Election results

References

External links
 David Boothroyd's United Kingdom Election Results 

European Parliament constituencies in England (1979–1999)
Politics of Hertfordshire
Politics of Essex
1994 establishments in England
1999 disestablishments in England
Constituencies established in 1994
Constituencies disestablished in 1999